Ashton is an unincorporated community located in the town of Springfield, in Dane County, Wisconsin, United States. The community was named after Thomas Ashton, the president of the British Temperance Emigration Society.

St. Peter's Roman Catholic Church in Ashton is listed on the National Register of Historic Places.

Notes

Unincorporated communities in Wisconsin
Unincorporated communities in Dane County, Wisconsin